Finale Ligure Marina railway station serves the town of Finale Ligure, in the Liguria region, northwestern Italy.  Opened in 1872, it forms part of the Genoa–Ventimiglia railway. The train services are operated by Trenitalia.

History
The station was called Finalmarina until 1927 when its name was changed to Finale Ligure Marina. The station building was designed by Roberto Narducci and was built in 1938.

Train services
The station is served by the following service(s):

Intercity services Ventimiglia - Savona - Genoa - La Spezia - Pisa - Livorno - Rome
Intercity services Ventimiglia - Savona - Genoa - Milan
Regional services (Treno regionale) Ventimiglia - Savona - Genoa - Sestri Levante - La Spezia - San Stefano di Magra

See also

History of rail transport in Italy
List of railway stations in Liguria
Rail transport in Italy
Railway stations in Italy

References

This article is based upon a translation of the Italian language version as at November 2016.

External links

Railway stations in Liguria
Railway stations opened in 1872